ZOE Broadcasting Network, Inc. (ZOE TV) is a Philippine broadcast media arm of the Jesus Is Lord Church. Based in Ortigas Center, Pasig, it operates a network of television and radio stations each in Mega Manila, Puerto Princesa City, Visayas, Northern Mindanao and Davao Region. The company also owns its first television station in Metro Manila, VHF 11 and UHF 20 which is currently airing A2Z, a joint-venture partnership between ZOE TV and ABS-CBN Corporation through its blocktime agreement.

History

Initial period
The frequency rights of Channel 11 under call letters DWXI-TV in Metro Manila was given to a joint venture of influential religious groups in the 1990s: El Shaddai a Catholic charismatic-based group headed by Mike Velarde and Jesus Is Lord Church an evangelical Protestant group headed by Eddie Villanueva. Conflict of interests started the two groups to contest the full ownership of the station. The Philippine Congress intervened and awarded to Mr. Villanueva and the JIL the right to acquire channel 11. Villanueva paid Velarde for the stocks and assets held by the channel's then-owner Delta Broadcasting System (DBS).

On April 13, 1998, JIL began its broadcast history with channel 11's relaunch as DZOE-TV, with ZOE Broadcasting Network, Inc. as the new corporate name. It also launched the new station ID and slogan "Give Love, Celebrate Life," which have been the corporate motto for years.

In 1999, Entertainment Network (Enternet), headed by Benito Araneta, and ZOE entered in a channel lease agreement that saw Enternet occupying the station's morning and afternoon block through CNBC Asia. Three years later, disagreements on the contract led to ZOE pulling out Enternet's program block and the latter filing a case on Villanueva.

In 2001, ZOE TV became the first TV station to air the second EDSA Revolution.

In 2004, Villanueva resigned as the company's chair to run in the country's presidential elections. After ending last in the election results, Villanueva returned to ZOE and continues his appearance on various ZOE TV programs.

Channel lease agreements

In April 2005, Citynet Network Marketing and Productions, Inc., a subsidiary of GMA Network, Inc., and ZOE TV entered to an agreement for Citynet leasing the entire TV airtime block of the station in exchange of upgrading ZOE TV's facilities and ZOE distributing its in-house programs to GMA Network's airtime.

On September 1, 2005, channel 11 quietly went off the air as GMA installed, upgraded and rehabilitated the transmitter and studios of ZOE TV. At the same time, Channel 11's 40 kW transmitter in Ortigas was decommissioned in favor of an upgraded 100 kW transmitter facility purchased by GMA located at the GMA Tower of Power site in Brgy. Culiat, Quezon City, with ZOE maintaining transmitter operations for the station (due to current ownership restrictions requiring only one station per broadcaster per frequency). ZOE TV, meanwhile, was relaunched on Channel 33 through its new call letters DZOZ-TV (a variant of DZOE-TV). Channel 33 began using its newly constructed 30 kW transmitter tower station located in Antipolo, while retaining the Ortigas Center studios as its master control facility.

On November 11, 2005, after a series of test broadcasts, GMA Network finally handled master control operations of channel 11 and launched their new second TV network through ZOE TV. It started as an all-female lifestyle channel QTV (Quality TeleVision; later renamed as simply Q on March 18, 2007), then reformatted as news and public affairs channel GMA News TV (now GTV) on February 28, 2011.

In July 2006, Channel 33 began on test broadcast with its airing of job opening program Future Finder on limited broadcast hours in preparation for a relaunch of DZOZ-TV's new branding on November 27, 2006. On that day, after the series of test broadcasts, it began broadcasting, then under a blocktime agreement between ZOE and Makati-based Estima, Inc. The result of the deal was student-oriented channel UniversiTV. The channel has proven to be a hub for college and university students, catering them with evening and overnight programs every day. By that time, it operated from 4 pm to 8 am the following day, but eventually retracted its broadcast hours until 4 am during its last few months of airing. However, on March 10, 2008, UniversiTV ceased its agreement with Channel 33, possibly due to poor ratings and lack of advertisers' support. This made ZOE TV left with almost no programming to offer along with the return of the old ZOE TV station ID from 1998 until 2005, though, they surprisingly aired entertainment programs in the evening and a weekday morning TeleRadyo-formatted news program under the ZTV 33 brand. UniversiTV on the other hand, was then relaunched as a Pay TV channel via satellite and cable operators, but totally ceased operations by 2010.

Recent developments 

On March 1, 2011, a day after channel 11 was relaunched as GMA News TV (now GTV), channel 33 was rebranded as Light TV 33, introducing new programs produced by ZOE, and at the same time, relaunching its in-house news production through its flagship newscast News Light. Soon, channel 33 slowly regained its programming with programs mostly dedicated to religious formats. On March 31, 2014, Light TV was renamed as Light Network, launched its refreshed logo, and had a new slogan called "Experience Light" (with "light" as reference to JIL's belief in Jesus Christ as "the light of the world"), while retaining the slogan "Kaibigan Mo" (Your Friend).

On February 28, 2017, DZOZ-TV formally ceased its traditional analog terrestrial television signal, while officially launching its digital terrestrial television signal, using the ISDB-T standard. Upon doing so, it became the first Philippine television station to permanently shut down analog transmissions, as part of the country's wider transition rollout to digital TV. A week later, on March 6, Light Network revamped its on-air presentation to reflect the digitization completion. It also launched its slogan "Magaan dito, Kaibigan" (It's light here, Friend), giving another definition to the word "light" as an easy or light-hearted experience due to its programming.

On February 12, 2018, Light Network reverted its name as Light TV with its new slogan "God's Channel of Blessings".

On April 24, 2019, GMA Network/Citynet Network Marketing and Productions announced that it will terminate its blocktime agreement with ZOE Broadcasting after June 2, 2019. The split comes after the release of GMA's 2018 financial report which declared the increasing lease payments that the network contributes to ZOE for the past three years in exchange of operating DZOE-TV (from ₱899.89 million in 2016 to almost a billion pesos in 2018). Third-party sources reported that Channel 11 would run as a full-power analog satellite of DZOZ-DTV after the termination of the agreement, but ZOE has no official statement yet on its future plans. The termination took effect in two phases: all of ZOE's in-house programs were pulled out from GMA & GMA News TV's programming by June 3; and a day after, GMA News TV Manila's intellectual unit (master control, sales, and employees) transferred to Citynet's DWDB-TV for the remainder of the analog broadcast run.

To continue GMA Manila's digital television broadcast, DZBB-TV and its GMA News TV (now GTV) subchannel are reported to transfer to UHF channel 15 (479.143 MHz), which the National Telecommunications Commission, through a memorandum circular in 2016, authorized to operate as part of NTC's plans to license digital channels 14-20 for major TV broadcasts.

On June 22, 2020, ZOE Broadcasting Network break their record as the first broadcasting company who officially switched and migrated to digital broadcast when they managed to re-air Light TV back on analog broadcast via its flagship TV station VHF 11, one year after GMA News TV (now GTV) moved its operations via UHF 27. 4 days later, however, the analog simulcast was short-lived and was replaced with Christian programming content while still conducting its test broadcast. It is rumored to be part of marketing the channel for either airtime/blocktime or for channel leasing.

Partnership with ABS-CBN
On October 10, 2020, ZOE Broadcasting Network made its blocktime agreement with ABS-CBN Corporation (5 months after its shutdown on free television) and rebrand ZOE TV as A2Z on VHF Channel 11. The new channel airs shows and movies produced by ABS-CBN as well as religious shows from its sister station, Light TV, Trinity Broadcasting Network and CBN Asia.

Meanwhile, after a month of launching of the said new channel, the National Telecommunications Commission (NTC) investigated ABS-CBN and ZOE Broadcasting Network if the said blocktime agreement of two stations are processed in legal ways.

Affiliation with PRTV Tacloban
On September 20, 2021, ZOE Broadcasting Network signed an affiliation deal with the Philippine Collective Media Corporation's PRTV Tacloban to air A2Z's programming on PRTV Tacloban, As a result, PRTV Tacloban became a network-affiliated station for the first time in its history.

Legislative franchise renewal
On July 17, 2016, the Philippine Congress passed Republic Act No. 10888, known as "An Act Renewing for Another Twenty-Five (25) Years the Franchise Granted to ZOE Broadcasting Network, Inc., Amending for the Purpose Republic Act No. 7297, Entitled “An Act Granting the ZOE Broadcasting Network, Inc.  a Franchise to Construct, Install, Operate and Maintain Radio and Television Broadcasting Stations Throughout the Philippines, and for Other Purposes”, as Amended by Republic Act No. 7968", granting ZOE TV a legislative franchise for its radio and television broadcast operations all throughout the country.

Stations

TV stations

Digital

Digital affiliate stations

Analog (shutoff by end-2023)

Radio stations

Programming

External links
Official Site Light TV (New)

See also
List of analog television stations in the Philippines
List of digital television stations in the Philippines
List of companies of the Philippines

References

 
Television networks in the Philippines
Television channels and stations established in 1998
Christian radio stations in the Philippines
Companies based in Pasig